Walter Ronge (Rongo in some sources) was a U.S. soccer player who earned one cap with the U.S. national team.  Ronge played professionally with Chicago Schwaben of the National Soccer League of Chicago.  He earned his one cap with the national team in a 2–0 loss to Colombia on February 5, 1961.

United States men's international soccer players
National Soccer League (Chicago) players
Chicago Schwaben players
Living people
American soccer players
Association footballers not categorized by position
Year of birth missing (living people)